2021 CAF Champions League may refer to:

 2020–21 CAF Champions League
 2021–22 CAF Champions League